The Communauté de communes du Haut Clocher  is a former communauté de communes in the Somme département and in the Picardie région of France. It was created in December 1999. It was merged into the new Communauté de communes du Ponthieu-Marquenterre in January 2017.

Composition 
This Communauté de communes comprised 20 communes:

Ailly-le-Haut-Clocher
Brucamps
Buigny-l'Abbé
Bussus-Bussuel
Cocquerel
Coulonvillers
Cramont
Domqueur
Ergnies
Francières
Gorenflos
Long
Maison-Roland
Mesnil-Domqueur
Mouflers
Oneux
Pont-Remy
Saint-Riquier
Villers-sous-Ailly
Yaucourt-Bussus

See also 
Communes of the Somme department

References

Haut Clocher